The Faithful Companions of Jesus Sisters (FCJ Sisters, French: Fidèles compagnes de Jésus) is a Christian religious institute of the Roman Catholic Church directly subject to the Pope.  It was founded in Amiens in France in 1820 by Marie Madeleine de Bonnault d'Houët.

Service
The FCJ sisters can be found in the Americas, Asia, Australia and Europe.

In Australia
The FCJ sisters first arrived in Australia in 1882 and soon founded a school in Richmond, an inner suburb in Melbourne. Vaucluse College FCJ was soon at capacity, so land was purchased in Kew. They built a new convent and boarding school which marked the establishment of Genazzano FCJ College. In 1900 the Sisters set up a school in Benalla called FCJ College and in 1968 founded Stella Maris Convent and boarding school in Frankston, Victoria. The Stella Maris Convent and Vaucluse College FCJ have since closed.

Today, FCJ communities exist around the country.

In 2002 the Sisters joined with those in Indonesia and the Philippines to form a new province—the Province of Asia-Australia.  New foundations are to be established elsewhere in South East Asia.

In literature
An interesting perspective on the FCJ sisters is given in God's Callgirl, the autobiography of Carla van Raay (Australia, 2004) in which the author describes joining the institute at the age of 18 in 1956, and her subsequent 12 years as a novice and sister, before voluntarily leaving at the age of 30.  Vaucluse College FCJ, Genazzano FCJ College and Benalla are all mentioned in the book.  This period coincided with Vatican II, which resulted in a number of strict rules being relaxed.

Schools
Sourced from the fcjsisters website.

Australia
Genazzano FCJ College, Melbourne
FCJ College Benalla, Benalla, Victoria
Vaucluse College, Richmond, Victoria (closed 2000)

Europe

Belgium
St. John's International School, Waterloo (until its sale in 2016)

Ireland
FCJ Secondary, Bunclody 
Laurel Hill Coláiste, Limerick
Laurel Hill Secondary School, Limerick

United Kingdom
England
Bellerive FCJ Catholic College, Liverpool
Gumley House Convent School, London
Maria Fidelis RC Convent School, London
Newlands School, Middlesbrough (merged with St David's School in 2009)
Poles Convent, Ware, Hertfordshire (closed in 1986; merged with St Edmund's College)
St Joseph's Convent, Hartlepool (now English Martyrs School and Sixth Form College)
Upton Hall School, Upton, Merseyside
Hollies Convent FCJ School, Manchester. Founded 1853, closed in 1985.
Stella Maris Convent, Broadstairs

North America
St. Mary's High School, Calgary,  Alberta, Canada
Saint Philomena School, Portsmouth, Rhode Island, USA

Notes

External links
FCJ Sisters – International website

Religious organizations established in 1820
Catholic female orders and societies
Catholic religious institutes established in the 19th century
Women's congregations following Ignatian spirituality
Women in France